Chrysolina virgata is a species of leaf beetle in the genus Chrysolina.

Taxonomy
The genus Chrysolina currently contains 39 subgenera. C. virgata is located in the subgenus Euchrysolina which additionally contains only C. graminis and its five associated subspecies; this subgenus was first established in 1950 by Bechyné.

Description
C. virgata is a small, round leaf beetle. Dorsally it is metallic green in colour, iridescent bronze on its elytra and pronotum. It is also finely punctured across both areas.

Distribution and habitat
C. virgata is a Palaearctic species native to East Asia and Japan.

References

External links
List of published resources on C. virgata at Biodiversity Heritage Library

Chrysomelinae
Beetles of Asia
Insects of Japan
Beetles described in 1860